Blue Moon is the third studio album by American country music artist Toby Keith. It was released on April 16, 1996 by Mercury Records. The album was certified platinum by the RIAA for sales of one million copies in the United States. Overall, it produced three singles for Keith on the Billboard Hot Country Songs charts: "Does That Blue Moon Ever Shine on You?" (#2), "A Woman's Touch" (#6), and "Me Too" (#1).

The lead single was issued via Polydor Records, which closed soon afterward and resulted in Keith moving to A&M for the album's release proper. Mercury Records took over for the third single. Keith later said that he was only with A&M briefly for fifteen weeks.

Track listing

Personnel
Michael Black – background vocals
Michael Crossno – electric guitar
Tom Flora – background vocals
Sonny Garrish – steel guitar
Carl "Chuck" Goff Jr. – bass guitar
Tim Gonzales – harmonica
Owen Hale – drums
Johnny Helms – steel guitar
Clayton Ivey – keyboards
Toby Keith – lead vocals
Chris Leuzinger – electric guitar
Gary Lunn – bass guitar
Brent Mason – electric guitar
Keith Mellington – drums
Don Potter – acoustic guitar
Ron "Snake" Reynolds – electric guitar, percussion
Russell Terrell – background vocals
Chris Troup – keyboards
Dennis Wilson – background vocals
Reggie Young – electric guitar

Additional background vocals on "The Lonely" provided by Chuck Cannon and Lari White.

Charts

Weekly charts

Year-end charts

Certifications

References

1996 albums
Toby Keith albums
A&M Records albums
Albums produced by Toby Keith